Zangiota is a district of Tashkent Region in Uzbekistan. The capital lies at the town Eshonguzar. Between 2010 and 2017, the territory of Tashkent District was part of Zangiota District.

The district consists of 12 urban-type settlements (Eshonguzar, Oʻrtaovul, Xonabod, Erkin, Quyoshli, Daliguzar, Pastdarxon, Tarnov, Zangiota, Nazarbek, Axmad Yassaviy, Ulugʻbek) and 9 rural communities (Turkiston, Qatortol, Chigʻatoy-Oqtepa, Nazarbek, Zangiota, Oʻzgarish, Boz-su, Honobod, Erkin).

References

Districts of Uzbekistan
Tashkent Region